Captain John Philip Cromwell (September 11, 1901 – November 19, 1943) was the most senior submariner awarded the Medal of Honor in World War II and one of the three submarine officers who received it posthumously. In some ways similar to his fellow honoree, Howard Gilmore, Cromwell consciously chose to sacrifice his own life to safeguard the lives of others, in a combat action which took place in November 1943.

Early life and career
Cromwell was born in Henry, Illinois, on September 11, 1901. Appointed to the U.S. Naval Academy in 1920, he graduated in June 1924 and served initially in the battleship USS Maryland school and was assigned to  during 1927–29. He next had three year's diesel engineering instruction, followed by further tours of duty in submarines.

Lieutenant Cromwell commanded  in 1936–37, then served on the staff of Commander Submarine Division 4. He was promoted to the rank of lieutenant commander in 1939 and spent two years in Washington, D.C. with the Bureau of Engineering and Bureau of Ships. In May 1941, he became engineer officer for the Pacific Fleet submarine force.

World War II

It was Cromwell's first war patrol also.

While attacking a Japanese convoy on November 19, 1943, Sculpin was forced to the surface, fatally damaged in a gun battle and abandoned by her surviving crew members. Captain Cromwell, who knew secret details of the impending operation to capture the Gilbert Islands, deliberately remained on board as she sank. For his sacrificial heroism in preventing the enemy from obtaining this information, he posthumously received the Medal of Honor.

Medal of Honor action
After a brief overhaul,  left Pearl Harbor for her ninth war patrol on 5 November 1943. After refueling at Johnston Island on 7 November, she departed for her assigned station northeast of Truk. On 29 November, COMSUBPAC radioed  to order CAPT Cromwell to activate the wolfpack. When  failed to acknowledge the message, even after several repetitions, she was assumed – correctly – to have been lost at sea. It wasn't until after the war that the details of her loss – and that of John Cromwell – to enemy action became known from both Japanese sources and surviving crewmembers who had been prisoners of war.

 had actually arrived on station on 16 November and made radar contact with a large, high-speed convoy on the night of the 18th. After making a fast surface run to get ahead of the quarry, LCDR Connaway submerged for an attack at dawn. Then, he surfaced again to attempt another end run in broad daylight. Unfortunately, the Japanese destroyer Yamagumo had lagged behind the convoy specifically to counter such a move and, after forcing Connaway to make a quick dive, dropped a pattern of depth charges that – unbeknownst to the crew – damaged the depth gauge.  went deep and laid low for several hours.

Around noon, Connaway attempted to bring  back to periscope depth, seeking another opportunity to attack. However, while coming up, the broken depth gauge stuck at 125 feet, confusing the diving officer, and causing the boat to broach the surface in full view of Yamagumo, which was still patrolling the area. As  crash-dived again, the Japanese destroyer dropped a string of 18 depth charges, severely damaging the boat and causing temporary loss of depth control. Numerous leaks developed in the hull, and so much water came on board that the submarine was forced to run at high speed to maintain depth. This invited a second Japanese attack that did even more damage.

At this point, Connaway concluded that the only chance of saving his crew was to come to the surface and fight it out there.  surfaced, and with decks awash, her crew manned the deck guns. The result of this uneven contest was hardly in doubt. Yamagumo's first salvo hit 's conning tower, killing the entire bridge watch team, including Connaway and his executive and gunnery officers. The gun crew died almost instantly from shrapnel. The senior ship's officer surviving, a reserve lieutenant, ordered the boat scuttled and the crew to abandon ship.

This action left CAPT Cromwell facing a fateful choice. With his personal knowledge of both ULTRA and GALVANIC, he realized immediately that to abandon ship and become a prisoner of the Japanese would create a serious danger of compromising these vital secrets to the enemy under the influence of drugs or torture. For this reason, he refused to leave the stricken submarine and gave his life to avoid capture.

After action summary
Forty-two members of Sculpin's crew – three officers and 39 enlisted men – were pulled from the sea by the Japanese, though one of the latter, badly wounded, was thrown back. The 41 survivors were taken to Truk and interrogated for ten days by Japanese intelligence officers. Those on Unyo arrived in Japan in early December and spent the rest of the war working in the Ashio copper mines, after which they were repatriated to tell their story.

On the evening of 3 December 1943, 240 miles southeast of Yokosuka – with some help from ULTRA –  sank Chuyo, and only one of the  prisoners on board survived.

When the story of John Cromwell's heroic sacrifice was revealed in the accounts of the  survivors, COMSUBPAC VADM Charles Lockwood nominated him for the Medal of Honor. The award was approved and presented posthumously to Cromwell's widow after the war.

Awards and honors

Medal of Honor citation
Rank and organization: Captain, U.S. Navy. Born: 11 September 1901, Henry, Ill. Appointed from: Illinois. Other Navy award: Legion of Merit.

Citation
For conspicuous gallantry and intrepidity at the risk of his life above and beyond the call of duty as Commander of a Submarine Coordinated Attack Group with Flag in the U.S.S. Sculpin, during the Ninth War Patrol of that vessel in enemy-controlled waters off Truk Island, November 19, 1943. Undertaking this patrol prior to the launching of our first large-scale offensive in the Pacific, Captain Cromwell, alone of the entire Task Group, possessed secret intelligence information of our submarine strategy and tactics, scheduled Fleet movements and specific attack plans. Constantly vigilant and precise in carrying out his secret orders, he moved his underseas flotilla inexorably forward despite savage opposition and established a line of submarines to southeastward of the main Japanese stronghold at Truk. Cool and undaunted as the submarine, rocked and battered by Japanese depth-charges, sustained terrific battle damage and sank to an excessive depth, he authorized the Sculpin to surface and engage the enemy in a gun-fight, thereby providing an opportunity for the crew to abandon ship. Determined to sacrifice himself rather than risk capture and subsequent danger of revealing plans under Japanese torture or use of drugs, he stoically remained aboard the mortally wounded vessel as she plunged to her death. Preserving the security of his mission at the cost of his own life, he had served his country as he had served the Navy, with deep integrity and an uncompromising devotion to duty. His great moral courage in the face of certain death adds new luster to the traditions of the United States Naval Service. He gallantly gave his life for his country.

Other honors
In 1954, the destroyer escort  was named in his honor.

Cromwell Hall, the Navy's Submarine Learning Center at the submarine base in Groton, Connecticut, was also named for him.

See also

List of Medal of Honor recipients for World War II

Notes

References

 

1901 births
1943 deaths
United States Navy Medal of Honor recipients
United States Navy personnel killed in World War II
Recipients of the Legion of Merit
United States Naval Academy alumni
United States Navy officers
United States submarine commanders
People from Henry, Illinois
World War II recipients of the Medal of Honor
Military personnel from Illinois
Captains who went down with the ship